Galium coloradoense, the Colorado bedstraw, is a plant species in the  Rubiaceae. It is native to the southwestern United States: Arizona, New Mexico, Utah, Colorado, and southern Wyoming. It is dioecious, with male and female flowers on separate plants.

References

External links
Gardening Europe
San Juan College (Farmington New Mexico USA), Horticulture, Rubiaceae

coloradoense
Flora of Arizona
Flora of New Mexico
Flora of Utah
Flora of Colorado
Flora of Wyoming
Plants described in 1900
Dioecious plants
Flora without expected TNC conservation status